The 2000–01 SM-liiga season was the 26th season of the SM-liiga, the top level of ice hockey in Finland. 13 teams participated in the league, and TPS Turku won the championship.

Standings

Playoffs

Quarterfinals
 Jokerit - Kärpät 2:3 (2:1, 2:7, 1:2, 2:0, 0:1)
TPS - Pelicans 3:0 (3:0, 4:0, 6:1)
Tappara - Lukko 3:0 (3:2, 3:1, 5:3)
 HIFK - Ilves 2:3 (0:1 P, 4:2, 0:3, 3:0, 2:3)

Semifinal
TPS - Kärpät 3:0 (6:1, 4:2, 4:1)
Tappara - Ilves 3:0 (5:1, 4:1, 3:2 P)

3rd place
Ilves - Kärpät 2:0

Final
TPS - Tappara 3:1 (4:3, 0:3, 2:1, 2:1 P)

External links
 SM-liiga official website

1
Finnish
Liiga seasons